Begonia exalata is a species of plant in the family Begoniaceae. It is endemic to Ecuador.  Its natural habitat is subtropical or tropical high-altitude shrubland. It is threatened by habitat loss.

References

Flora of Ecuador
exalata
Vulnerable plants
Taxonomy articles created by Polbot